Mount Issa or Djebel Aïssa is a 2,236 m high mountain in western Algeria, thus the 4th highest in Algeria. It is part of the Ksour Range of the Saharan Atlas, within the larger Atlas Mountain System. 
Mount Issa is located in the Naâma Province and is one of the main summits of the mountains of the Saharan Atlas.

The Djebel Aissa National Park is a protected area within the area of the mountain since 2003.

See also
List of mountains in Algeria
Saharan Atlas

References

External links
Les montagnes d'atlas
Persée - Notes de géographie physique algérienne

Atlas Mountains
Issa
Mountains of Naama Province
Naâma
Geography of Naâma Province